ZNN may refer to:

ZNN, a fictional television news station resembling CNN, used in several Paramount Pictures productions and CBS television shows
ZENN Motor Company of Canada (TSX Venture Exchange symbol: ZNN)
.zNN, a file extension used for certain zipped files
ZNN-G, ZNN-J, or ZNN-L, hull classifications for airships of the U.S. Navy